Falanisi Manukia is a Tongan former rugby union player who played as fly-half.

Career
Manukia debuted for Tonga on 4 July 1993, playing against Australia in Brisbane He was also part of the 1995 Rugby World Cup Tonga squad, however, Manukia did not play any match in the tournament as the regular fly-half for Tonga was Elisi Vunipola. His last international cap was against Japan, in Tokyo on 19 February 1995.

References

External links

Date of birth missing (living people)
Tongan rugby union players
Rugby union fly-halves
Tonga international rugby union players
Living people
Tongan expatriates in New Zealand
Year of birth missing (living people)